Lohmann is a surname. Notable people with the surname include:

 Dietrich Lohmann (1943–1997), German cinematographer
 Fred von Lohmann, American lawyer
 George Lohmann (1865–1901), English cricketer
 Hanns-Heinrich Lohmann (1911–1995), German Obersturmbannführer, in the Waffen SS during World War II
 Hans Lohmann (1863–1934), German zoologist
  (born 1947), German classical archaeologist
 Henry Lohmann (1924–1967), Danish film actor
 Karl Baptiste Lohmann (1887-1963), Professor, Author, Landscape Architecture, Urban Planning at University of Illinois.
 Julia Lohmann (born 1977), German multidisciplinary designer
 Juliana Lohmann (born 1989), Brazilian actress and model
 Katie Lohmann (born 1980), American model and actress
 Lúcia Garcez Lohmann (IPNI Abbreviation: L.G.Lohmann), a botanist
 Ludger Lohmann (born 1954), German classical organist
 Martin B. Lohmann (1881–1980), American politician and businessman
 Nicolai Johan Lohmann Krog (1787–1856), Norwegian politician
 Paul Lohmann (1926-1995), cinematographer
 Sydney Lohmann (born 2000), German footballer
 Ulf Lohmann, German electronic music producer

Fictional characters:
 Karl Lohmann, fictional German detective

See also 
 1820 Lohmann, an asteroid
 Lohmann Brown, an egg-laying chicken
 Shade-Lohmann Bridge, a bridge over the Illinois River
 Lohman (disambiguation)